Birendranagar is a village development committee (VDC) in Chitwan District in the Narayani Zone of southern Nepal. At the time of the 2011 Nepal census it had a population of 14,934 people (6,909 male; 8,025 female) living in 3,374 individual households.

This VDC is located in about 150 km from Kathmandu in the south west direction from the capitalcity of Nepal, i.e. Kathmandu. Chitwan is the district where it falls in the eastern part, which is surrounded by six VDCs: Khairahani, Chainpur, Siddhi, Korak, Bhandara and Kathar. It is about two times bigger than Bhandara and Khairahani and similar in area as Chainpur. The village is divided into nine wards, which are further subdivided into one to seven groups.

There are at least four secondary schools in the area: Jana Adarsha Secomdary School, Vidya Memorial School, Bramha Nagar School and Shakura Private school and other which are mostly maintained by the community with little help from the government.

Birendranagar is very rich in resources, as it has a very large area covered by forests, one moderate river ( known as Pumpha Khola) however rest of the other plain area is used for cultivation. This VDC is getting developed now and has provided most of its residents the internet access and cable television as well as good transportation service. This place is a perfect combination of all the castes and faces of Nepal where they have been living very peacefully.

Since 2015 this Village has developed into a municipality called Rapti Municipality, the current municipality includes other 2 villages ( VDCs)  namely Bhandara and Piple.

References

Populated places in Chitwan District
Village development committees (Nepal)